Jeannine Brooke Riley (born October 1, 1940) is an American actress.

Early years 
The daughter of Mr. and Mrs. James Riley, she was born in Fresno, California, and moved with her family to Madera, California, after her father left the Army. She had two years' education in acting and other aspects of show business at the Pasadena Playhouse.

Career 
Early in her career, Riley performed on television in Fresno and in underwater ballet at a hotel.

She appeared in guest roles on numerous television series (Route 66, The Man from U.N.C.L.E., The Wild Wild West) and a few feature films such as The Big Mouth (1967), Fever Heat (1968), The Comic (1969) and Electra Glide in Blue (1973). In 1963, Riley appeared as Amelia Pryor on The Virginian in the episode "Run Away Home." Also in 1963 on Wagon Train in the episode “The Davey Baxter Story”.

Winning the role over 300 competitors, Riley portrayed Billie Jo Bradley on the first two seasons of the CBS sitcom Petticoat Junction (1963–1965). Riley left the series in 1965 to pursue movies. She also had a regular cast member role on the comedy variety series Hee Haw (1969–1971). She played Lulu McQueen (a take-off on Ginger Grant, played by Tina Louise, from Gilligan's Island) on the western sitcom Dusty's Trail, which aired in 1973–74.

In 2020, Riley released The Bolder Woman: It's About Time, a book she wrote "to instruct women how they can still fulfill their dreams no matter how old they get."

Partial filmography
Five Finger Exercise (1962) - Girl (uncredited)
Strike Me Deadly (1963) - Lori Grant
The Big Mouth (1967) - Bambi Berman
Fever Heat (1968) - Sandy Richards
The Comic (1969) - Lorraine Margaret Bell
Electra Glide in Blue (1973) - Jolene
The Outfit (1973) - Prostitute (uncredited)
The Wackiest Wagon Train in the West (1976) - Lulu McQueen
Lone Star Bar & Grill (1983) - Arlene
Timebomb (1991) - Landlady (final film role)

References

External links

1940 births
20th-century American actresses
Actresses from California
American film actresses
American television actresses
People from Madera, California
Living people
21st-century American women